The Riedlhütte narrow-gauge railway (German Feld- und Waldbahn Riedlhütte e.V.) is a not for profit light railway in Sankt Oswald-Riedlhütte in the Bayerischer Wald.

Track
There are four stations: Ohebrücke near the parking lot, Riedlhütte at the club house, Badeweiher at the lake and Krummwiese.

Operation 

The railway operates approximately 16 days per year, and if weather conditions permit, several trains will be in use.

The trains depart from 10:00 to 16:00 or 17:00 from the central station Riedlhütte. For the return trip they need altogether 18 min.

History 
The association was funded in 1987 as Feldbahn Fränking in Weichs-Fränking north of Munich. It built a 400m long track at the Deutsches Museum in Munich in 1996, on which they run trains between Ludwigsbrücke and the museum entrance. 2002 the association relocated to Sankt Oswald-Riedlhütte, where the parish provided a suitable site.

Rolling stock 

The railway operates with ten diesel locomotives of four manufacturers (3 Jung, 3 Gmeinder, 3 Diema and 1 Lkm). Most of the locos are ready to be used, but normally only up to 3 will be used on one day. There are also some goods and passenger cars and some auxiliary vehicles.

References

External links 

www.feldbahn-riedlhuette.de (Official Website in German)

Narrow gauge railways in Germany
Heritage railways in Germany
Bavarian Forest